Music FM was a Hungarian commercial radio station, airing at 89.5 FM in Budapest.

Music FM had a Top 50 popularity chart.

The station ceased its operations at 23:59 on 7 February 2019 after multiple unsuccessful applications to renew its permit for the frequency at the end of the seven years contract.

See also 
 List of Hungarian-language radio stations

External links
 Music FM

Music FM
Radio stations disestablished in 2019
Defunct radio stations
2019 disestablishments in Hungary
Defunct mass media in Hungary